Karambali is a Town in Gadhinglaj Taluka of Kolhapur district situated in the southwest corner of state Maharashtra, India. Karambali is situated on banks of mangai talav originated from the Great Amboli Ghats is about 30 km from Gadhinglaj towards south and 12 km from the second largest city Kadgaon in Gadhinglaj Taluka and just 2 km from Kaulage. It is managed by Town Council. In 2011 it has a population of about 15,856. Karambali is the eighth largest town in Gadhinglaj Taluka.

Cities and towns in Kolhapur district